The Soleil was a 38-gun ship of the line of the French Royal Navy, designed by Deviot and constructed by the Dutch shipwright Jan Gron (usually called Jean de Werth in French) at the new state dockyard at Île d'Indret near Nantes. She and her sister Lune were two-deckers, with a mixture of bronze guns on both gun decks.

The Soleil took part in the Battle of Orbitello on 14 June 1646, as the flagship of Chef d'escadre Marquis de Montigny, and in the Battle of Castellammare on 21/22 December 1647. By 1671 she had been re-armed with 22 x 12-pounders on the lower deck and 14 x 8-pounders on the upper deck. She was renamed Hercule on 24 June 1671, then quickly renamed Marquis 23 days later. She was condemned on 28 June 1672 and sold in August to be taken to pieces.

Sources and references 

Nomenclature des Vaisseaux de Louis XIII et de la régence d'Anne d'Autriche, 1610 a 1661. Alain Demerliac (Editions Omega, Nice – 2004).
The Sun King's Vessels (2015) - Jean-Claude Lemineur; English translation by François Fougerat. Editions ANCRE.  
Winfield, Rif and Roberts, Stephen (2017) French Warships in the Age of Sail 1626-1786: Design, Construction, Careers and Fates. Seaforth Publishing. . 

 Vaisseaux de Ligne Français de 1682 à 1780 1

Ships of the line of the French Navy
1640s ships